Mark Fellows (born February 26, 1963) is a former American football linebacker for the San Diego Chargers of the National Football League (NFL).  He played college football for Montana State. He was drafted by the San Diego Chargers with the 196th overall pick in the 1985 NFL Draft. He played for the Chargers in 1985 and 1986.

College career
Fellows played for Montana State from 1981 to 1984. In his senior year, Fellows set a school record with 23 sacks, as the team went on to win the 1984 NCAA Division I-AA Football Championship Game. He was inducted into the Montana State Hall of Fame in 1998.

Professional career
Fellows suffered a hip fracture early in the 1985 season, effectively ending his career.

Personal life
Fellows's family moved to Choteau, Montana when he was in the fourth grade. After retiring from football, Fellows returned to Choteau. He and his brother, Mike, now run their family cattle ranch. Fellows and his wife, Pam, have three children: a boy, Quest, and two younger daughters, Libby and Stephanie.

References

External links

1963 births
Living people
Montana State Bobcats football players
San Diego Chargers players
Players of American football from Montana
People from Choteau, Montana
Sportspeople from Billings, Montana
American football linebackers